Run of the Arrow is a 1957 American Western film written, directed, and produced by Samuel Fuller and starring Rod Steiger, Sara Montiel, Brian Keith, Ralph Meeker, Jay C. Flippen, and a young Charles Bronson. Set at the end of the American Civil War, the movie was filmed in Technicolor.

Plot
On the last day of the Civil War, O'Meara (Rod Steiger), a Confederate soldier, shoots a Union lieutenant, who is later revealed as named Driscoll (Ralph Meeker). When he sees that Driscoll is not dead, O'Meara takes him to nearby Appomattox, where he learns that General Lee is in the process of surrendering to General Grant. As the doctor (Carleton Young) removes O'Meara's bullet from Driscoll, O'Meara almost shoots Grant, but is stopped by the doctor, who gives him the bullet.  When O'Meara complains that he did not kill Driscoll only because the bullet was "warped", the doctor remarks that it is the "last bullet shot in this war" and gives it to O'Meara.

Returning to his home in Virginia, O'Meara rejects the pleas of his mother (Olive Carey) to put aside his hatred and settle down, as she notes the losses that the family and community have suffered in the war. O'Meara, however, refuses to accept the authority of the United States government and proclaims himself a man without a country. He heads west, hoping to join with the Sioux nation in their own wars against the American army.

O'Meara finds travel in strange territory difficult until he meets an aging Oglala scout named Walking Coyote (Jay C. Flippen), who speaks English, and says that he is heading back to his home tribe to die.  O'Meara and he travel together, with Walking Coyote teaching the White man the Sioux language and customs. The two, though, are captured by a band of Sioux warriors led by Crazy Wolf (H.M. Wynant), who is about to execute both men when Walking Coyote invokes the right to the "run of the arrow", a ritual that could save the men's lives if they can endure a run marked by arrows flying in their path.

During the run, Walking Coyote collapses and dies, but O'Meara is saved by a group of Sioux women, including Yellow Moccasin (Sara Montiel), who helps him to present himself to the tribe's chief, Blue Buffalo (Charles Bronson), and claim his right to his life for surviving the run. Blue Buffalo gives O'Meara safe haven as he recovers, in part because of their mutual hatred of the Americans. Having fallen in love, O'Meara asks permission to be married with Yellow Moccasin, proclaiming, "In my heart, my nation is Sioux."  When O'Meara also points out the similarities between his Christian God and the Indians' Great Spirit, Blue Buffalo agrees and O'Meara becomes an active member of the tribe. The couple adopts a mute orphan boy, Silent Tongue (Billy Miller), as their own son.

When the Sioux leader Red Cloud (Frank de Kova) negotiates an agreement with Army General Allen (Tim McCoy) for the soldiers to build Fort Lincoln within a prescribed area, O'Meara becomes a guide and translator for the soldiers under the command of Captain Clark (Brian Keith). Clark's second in command is the same Lieutenant Driscoll that O'Meara had shot and then saved, and who now shows a passionate hatred of the Indians. O'Meara's own hostility to the "Yankees" is lessened, however, when, during the journey to the fort's site, Silent Tongue nearly perishes in quicksand, but is saved by a soldier who gives his own life in the rescue.

At the agreed-on site for the fort, the soldiers are attacked by Crazy Wolf, who kills Captain Clark and wants to start a war. O'Meara disarms Crazy Wolf, but offers him the "run of the arrow" to spare his own life. Driscoll, however, violates the ritual when he shoots and wounds Crazy Wolf, who is taken back to his tribe by O'Meara. Taking command, Driscoll then has his men move the fort's site to a location that is more strategic, but violates the terms of the agreement with the Sioux. Blue Buffalo prepares to attack the fort, but agrees to let O'Meara attempt to intercede with the soldiers. Driscoll takes O'Meara prisoner and prepares to hang him, when the Indians attack in a brutal battle that kills many of the army troops and destroys the fort. Driscoll is captured and is about to be skinned alive for his violation of Crazy Wolf's run of the arrow, but O'Meara, in an act of mercy, shoots Driscoll with the bullet he had once used before.

Yellow Moccasin tells O'Meara that as he could not bear for Driscoll to be skinned alive, he is not a true Sioux - underlined by his referring to the Sioux warriors as "they" instead of "we". Realizing that he is still a man without a country, O'Meara guides the surviving soldiers to Fort Laramie, accompanied by Yellow Moccasin and Silent Tongue. A final written statement on the screen declares, "The end of this story can only be written by you."

Production notes
Run of the Arrow was one of the first films to use blood squibs to simulate realistic bullet impacts. The movie was filmed at Snow Canyon and Pine Valley Lake in St. George, Utah, which is far from actual Sioux territory.

Originally produced by RKO Radio Pictures, the studio ended its distribution activities before the movie was released. Universal Pictures handled the distribution.

Sara Montiel's voice is dubbed by Angie Dickinson.

At the time of its release, critics commented favorably on director Samuel Fuller's decision to concentrate on feet in the "run of the arrow" scene rather than showing the actors in full. Fuller later explained that Steiger had badly sprained his ankle just before the scene was to be shot and was unable to walk, so he had one of the Indian extras run in Steiger's place.

The movie is currently available through the Warner Archive Collection.

After Dances With Wolves was released in 1990, several knowledgeable critics, including Jeremy Arnold in the Los Angeles Times and Angela Aleiss in her essay for the Library of Congress' National Film Registry, noted that the plot was almost identical to this picture.

References

External links
 
 
 Run of the Arrow at Rotten Tomatoes
 Run of the Arrow at the American Film Institute's Catalog of Feature Films: The First 100 Years, 1883-1983.

1957 films
1957 Western (genre) films
American Civil War films
American Western (genre) films
1950s English-language films
Films scored by Victor Young
Films directed by Samuel Fuller
Films shot in Utah
RKO Pictures films
Revisionist Western (genre) films
1950s American films